Left for Dead is a 2005 British action film directed by Ross Boyask.

Plot
Left for Dead is a revenge thriller set in a city called Hope, where a crime lord called Kincaid rules with an iron fist. Williams, a former hitman for Kincaid, is attacked and left for dead when he tries to leave the organisation. He teams up with Kelso, a kickboxer who had his hands smashed by Kincaid, and together they must fight to exact revenge on the criminal empire that holds their city in an iron grasp.

Cast
Mostly the filmmakers cast unknowns in the film. Original Kincaid actor Gordon Alexander left the production after 2 months due to 'creative differences'. He later went on to star in the critically hammered British arthouse action film The Purifiers.

Left for Dead also features the first on-screen performance from Bourne Ultimatum star Joey Ansah in a very small combat role.

Actors and stunt performers Jon Foo and Joey Ansah have cameo roles as one of the fighters.

Production
Left For Dead was shot over 18 months in Brighton and Eastbourne, East Sussex and debuted at Cannes 2004 with a packed market screening in the Riviera building.  It was quickly picked up by sales agent Barbara Mudge and her Beverly Hills-based company Worldwide Filmed Entertainment LLC.

Self-funded, the film was the work of UK director-producer team Ross Boyask & Phil Hobden. Starring Glenn (Take Three Girls, The Silencer) Salvage, Andy Prior, Adam Chapman and a host of the UK's most talented action martial arts stars, 'Left For Dead' has action choreographed by Gordon Alexander (Accidental Spy) & Independent Stunts (Blood Myth, The Silencer)

The film has been released in over 15 countries to date, including the UK, Canada, USA and Thailand.

Critical reaction

'John Woo Styled action in a UK Setting'
Kim Newman – Empire Magazine

'If this film had been made in the 70s Tarantino would cite it as an influence'
Mike Leeder – Impact (action entertainment magazine)

'Taking low budget action cinema to new levels of delirium and viciousness, Left For Dead happens to be an amazing adrenaline rush of a film'
Matthew Sanderson, Rumourmachine.com

'Left for Dead is one hell of an action movie... pushing the action to extremes while maintaining an engaging plot' 4/5
Mark Pollard, Kungfucinema.com

'bloody and violent martial arts action... the fights come at you furiously... Left For Dead, thankfully, differs from the norm' − 6.5/10
Gregory Conley, yourvideostoreshelf.com

'Sets a whole new standard for digital video production... the UK movie scene just got its butt kicked!' 4.5/5
Dean Meadows, VENGEANCE Magazine

References

External links
 
 

2005 films
British independent films
2005 action films
2000s English-language films
Kickboxing films
British action films
2005 independent films
2000s British films